Toma Simionov (born 30 October 1955) is a retired Romanian sprint canoer, who competed in doubles together with his elder brother Gheorghe and later with Ivan Patzaichin. He won three Olympic medals with two gold (1980 and 1984) and one silver (1984). He also won nine medals at the ICF Canoe Sprint World Championships with three golds (C-2 1000 m: 1981, 1983; C-2 10000 m: 1982), four silvers (C-2 1000 m: 1978, C-2 10000 m: 1978, 1981, 1983), and two bronzes (C-2 500 m: 1978, C-2 1000 m: 1979).

References

External links

1955 births
Canoeists at the 1980 Summer Olympics
Canoeists at the 1984 Summer Olympics
Living people
Olympic canoeists of Romania
Olympic gold medalists for Romania
Olympic silver medalists for Romania
Romanian male canoeists
Olympic medalists in canoeing
ICF Canoe Sprint World Championships medalists in Canadian

Medalists at the 1984 Summer Olympics
Medalists at the 1980 Summer Olympics